WMAN may refer to:

 WMAN (AM), a radio station (1400 AM) licensed to Mansfield, Ohio, USA
 WMAN-FM, a radio station (100.1 FM) licensed to Shelby, Ohio, USA
 IEEE 802.16, the group preparing formal specifications for Wireless Metropolitan Area Networks